Alberto Luis Galateo (May 4, 1912 – February 26, 1961) was an Argentinian football forward who played for Argentina in the 1934 FIFA World Cup. He also played for Unión de Santa Fe.

Galateo played professionally for Club Atlético Huracán, Chacarita Juniors and Racing Club de Avellaneda from 1935 to 1939.

Death
In February 1961, Galateo was killed by his son David José, in a family dispute. He wanted to kill his wife, so his son came in her defense, shooting him dead. His grandson, Damián, produced a film (Terror Familiar) about these events.

Fifa World Cup Career

International goals
Argentina's goal tally first

References

External links

Argentine footballers
Argentine people of Italian descent
Argentina international footballers
1934 FIFA World Cup players
1912 births
1961 deaths
Association football forwards